Mxolisi Mthethwa (born 18 September 1978) is a Liswati former footballer who played as a midfielder.

External links

1978 births
Living people
Swazi footballers
Eswatini international footballers
Manzini Wanderers F.C. players
Royal Leopards F.C. players

Association football midfielders